The following highways are numbered 591:

United States
Territories
  Puerto Rico Highway 591

Former
  Ohio State Route 591 (1937–1955)